Amer Maatouq Al Fadhel (born 21 April 1988) is a Kuwaiti professional footballer who plays as a midfielder for Kuwaiti Premier League club Al Qadsia.

References

1988 births
Living people
Kuwaiti footballers
Qadsia SC players
Kuwait international footballers
2011 AFC Asian Cup players
2015 AFC Asian Cup players
Footballers at the 2006 Asian Games
Sportspeople from Kuwait City
Association football midfielders
Asian Games competitors for Kuwait
AFC Cup winning players
Kuwait Premier League players
Al-Fahaheel FC players
Al Tadhamon SC players